San Benancio is an unincorporated community in Monterey County, California. It is located in the San Benancio Canyon.

History and etymology
The region was named for San Benancio Gulch which is the small canyon that forms the majority of the region. A map dated 1834 lists the region as "Canada de San Benancio". The Spanish name most likely refers to one of four saints venerated with the name Venantius.

San Benancio was the inspiration for "Las Pasturas del Cielo," the fictional setting in John Steinbeck’s Pastures of Heaven.  A Salinas native, Steinbeck spent time in his youth within San Benancio, specifically Castle Rock near the base of the Canyon, and accurately described the region in Pastures of Heaven:

Geography and climate
While it has no official boundaries the colloquial place-name “San Benancio” refers to homes and businesses residing on or directly reached by San Benancio Road. This includes the Ambler Park and Harper Canyon regions found along the road.

The road itself is located along the Monterey-Salinas highway (California State Route 68) roughly equidistant from Salinas and Monterey.

The walls of San Benancio Canyon have an elevation of 400 ft and run adjacent to Toro Creek, a small tributary to the Salinas River which is located 4 miles south. The canyon is home to a number of California Live Oak Trees and various types of wild sage brush and grass.

The canyon is home to a wide array of wildlife as well including deer, hawks, condors, wild pigs, California quail and a large population of wild turkeys, which, at their own peril, traverse San Benancio Road in the early mornings.

Government
At the county level, San Benancio is represented on the Monterey County Board of Supervisors by Supervisor Dave Potter.

In the United States House of Representatives, San Benancio is in

Education and recreation
San Benancio is served by the Washington Union School District. San Benancio Middle School which serves a little over 300 students in the 6th, 7th, and 8th grade, is located in San Benancio. The school was rated 9 out of 10 by the “Great Schools” website in 2007.

The region is also served by Titus Park, a private Swim and Tennis club located along San Benancio Road. The pool remains open daily from June to September and hours are dictated by weather.

References

 http://geonames.usgs.gov/pls/gnispublic/f?p=116:3:1083081856516542::NO::P3_FID,P3_TITLE:1954402%2CSan%20Benancio%20Canyon
 https://web.archive.org/web/20020206195628/http://www.monterey.k12.ca.us/~sbenanci/sbms/sbms.html

Unincorporated communities in Monterey County, California
Salinas Valley
Unincorporated communities in California